The 2022 Maurice Revello Tournament is an international association football tournament held in Bouches-du-Rhône, France. The twelve national teams involved in the tournament were required to register a squad of 23 players; only players in these squads are eligible to take part in the tournament.

Group A

Argentina
Head coach:  Javier Mascherano

Mateo Tanlongo (Rosario Central) was replaced by Francisco Marco.

France
Head coach:  Bernard Diomède

Pierre Ekwah (West Ham United U–23) was replaced by Robin Voisine.

Panama
Head coach:  David Dóniga Lara

Saudi Arabia
Head coach:  Saleh Al-Mohammadi

Group B

Ghana
Head coach:  Abdul-Karim Zito

Indonesia
Head coach:  Dženan Radončić

Mexico
Head coach:  Raúl Chabrand

Venezuela
Head coach:  Fernando Batista

Group C

Algeria
Head coach:  Noureddine Ould Ali

Colombia
Head coach:  Héctor Cárdenas

Yáser Asprilla (Envigado) and Deivi Barrios (Real Cartagena) were replaced by Luis Quintero and Élber Olaya, respectively.

Comoros
Head coach:  Hamada Jambay and  Samirdine Youssouf

Japan
The squad was announced in 23 May 2022. However, in 27 May, Isa Sakamoto replaced Naoki Kumata (FC Tokyo), who left the squad with an injury.

Head coach:  Koichi Togashi and  Yuzo Funakoshi

References

Toulon Tournament squads